Irvin M. Borish (January 21, 1913March 3, 2012) was an American optometrist who is widely considered "The Father of Modern Optometry". Even though he entered the field of optometry because his family could only afford to pay for two years of college, he left a lasting impression in the field. He wrote one of the most renowned textbooks of optometry, Clinical Refraction. He worked to create several educational and research institutions for optometry. He also lobbied tirelessly to establish optometry as a mainstream medical practice. His contribution to optometry has been recognized through prestigious awards and recognition from his peers.

Biography

Early life and education 

Irvin M. Borish was born on January 21, 1913, in Philadelphia, Pennsylvania. He also had a younger brother and sister who were twins. His family moved to Liberty, New York. in the Catskills as his father, Max, had contracted tuberculosis and Liberty had facilities that cared for tuberculosis patients. Because his father developed tuberculosis at a young age, his mother ran a house for TB patients to help make ends meet.

As a child, he was a voracious reader. He read all 26 volumes of The Book of Knowledge, an encyclopedia for kids. Later in college, he would read every book in the fiction section of a small library, starting with A right through to Z. But he was so near-sighted that, even though he moved to the front of the classroom he couldn't see the blackboard at school. When his family was finally able to afford to buy him his first pair of glasses, he said he could see individual leaves on trees for the first time in his life.

He graduated from high school in the spring of 1929, just as the Great Depression was about to begin. His family only had enough money for one child to attend college for two years and since Irv seemed to have the most potential, he was the one chosen. When considering a career, he wanted to be an author, so he enrolled at Temple University in Philadelphia to study literature. While he was still at college, Borish was persuaded by an uncle named Lou to consider the profession of optometry because it would give him a stable career. As this was a two-year program, it was more affordable, and in addition, uncle Lou and his wife also offered free room and board for Borish. So he moved to Chicago and enrolled at the Northern Illinois College of Optometry. While enrolled at the college, he could not afford textbooks and had to go to the library to read them, he generally memorized all of what he read and was the first student to earn straight A's despite never having his own books to study from.  It was later determined that he had a genius IQ.

Marriage and Children 
It was at the university that he met Beatrice Silver ("Bea") who came from a well-to-do family. They were set up on a blind date by friends. Both were well-read and they had a lively conversation. Also, to quote Borish, "I was a good dancer." But Bea was seeing two other men at the time and nothing more came of the blind date, mainly because Borish did not have any money to take her out.

When he bumped into her again months later at a school dance, they reconnected and Borish knew of a local play offering tickets at half price and asked her on a date. Borish was so broke that sometimes their date would consist of going to the ice cream store where "We'd buy one soda and two straws," Borish would say. They married on June 28, 1936. Their child, Frances Martha, was born the following year.  Beatrice nearly died giving birth and Borish spent weeks caring for his newborn child while Bea recovered. It was because of this that they had no more children.

Northern Illinois College of Optometry 
Richard Needles was a pioneer in the field of education in Optometry, and was the owner and president of the Northern Illinois College of Optometry (NICO). This is the facility that Borish spent his student days and his initial teaching years.

In 1937, when Needles set out to construct a new clinic for the college, he tasked Borish with creating the complete outline of the new structure for the architects. Along the years Borish became good friends with Needles and with Jere Heather who was the academic administrator at the clinic, but neither of them could be considered his mentor - they learned as much from Borish as he from them.

The same year, Borish wrote a clinical manual of refraction and other ophthalmic procedures for students to use in his classes. No comprehensive textbook on refraction had been written in the US and it created much interest among practitioners who had the opportunity to see it. Eventually it came to be used by the state board examiners.

In 1938 when Heather left, Borish took on his role as well - all academic and administrative duties involving the clinic now resided officially with Borish. When the US entered World War II, the enrollment at NICO started to fall, and with challenges in funding there was growing discord within the NICO leadership and eventually Borish resigned.

Contributions to optometry 

After that, in 1944, he moved to Kokomo, Indiana. to establish a private practice in optometry to apply his knowledge directly to patients. Finances were tight for his family. Also due to the war, all businesses including his were struggling to operate and to attract clients.

The same year Borish petitioned to create an Indiana chapter for the American Association of Optometry. He served as the president of the newly created chapter for two terms and then as secretary.

After the war ended, in 1947 there was an increase in attendance at optometry schools. There was a need for a textbook. Marty Topaz who was the owner and publisher of the Optometric Weekly Magazine asked Borish to write one. The book Clinical Refraction was published in 1949. There have been four editions of this book and the last one was renamed Borish's Clinical Refraction. This book has been a standard reference for the field of optometry.

Between 1962 and 1982 he was immersed in a nationwide effort to prepare and promote the profession if optometry for an expanded role in healthcare. He recognized that to get optometry recognized as a main-steam science it needed to be taught at universities. There was also resistance from ophthalmologists some of whom considered it quackery. Over several years Dr. Borish lobbied and negotiated extensively to get a couple of laws passed in Indiana - one that would incorporate diagnostic and therapeutic drugs in optometric practice, and the other to require that optometry be taught at universities. He also served as an editorial consultant and referee to the Journal of the American Optometric Association.

He helped create the accreditation system used by the Council in Education of the American Optometric Association, and was the co-author of the association's first Manual of Accreditation. Between 1968 and 1982, he served on the accrediting body.

In 1973 after a near fatal heart attack, he was reluctant to slow down in any way, but his wife nudged him to move back to academia. Initially he went to the Indiana University in Bloomington to teach and perform research. Here he helped create a separate school of optometry. Prior to that optometry was taught as a division of the College of Arts and Sciences.

In 1982, he moved to the University of Houston in the role of Benedict Professor of Optometric Practice. His colleagues and friends created an initiative to raise a million dollars to create the Irvin M. Borish Chair in Optometric Practice.

In 1994 the Center for Ophthalmic Clinical Research was opened at the Indiana University. This center was named the "Borish Center for Ophthalmic Research".  He was invited to speak to the freshman class every year from 1982 until 2000, telling them the history of optometry and how he got involved and changed it.

Corneal contact lenses 
When contact lenses were becoming popular, Borish became an early adopter, prescribing them to several of his clients and family. In particular he was interested in the bifocal contact lenses. He devised methods and processes to create bifocal contact lenses for optimum performance. He established a lab in association with Emil Faris and Ronald Ulmer to produce quality lenses called the Indiana Contact Lens Company.

He holds several patents for his work on contact lenses. He developed methods to alter the spherical or cylindrical powers of the lenses which in turn he applied in the process for making bifocal lenses. He drew inspiration for this method while looking at a Dr. Scholl's shoe insert display at a drugstore.

He continued to be a consultant for Bausch & Lomb and other glasses and lens manufacturers for numerous years.

Art 

Borish always had an artistic streak. He wrote several poems to his wife Bea. In the early 1950s he took up drawing as a hobby. He found Leonardo da Vinci's complete set of drawings and used them to hone his skills. He always had at least one painting in progress. He tried diverse styles from impressionistic to surreal. He has also donated several of his paintings some of which have been used in charity auctions to raise money for good causes.

Retirement 
In 1990, Borish decided to retire due to his wife's deteriorating health. They moved to Palm Beach County. He continued to contribute to the field and stayed active.

He lectured at the Vision Expo in New York and in California, at the AAO's Ellerbrock Courses, and at all state and regional association meetings and at schools. He was invited yearly to speak to the freshman class at the University of Houston from 1980 to 2010 and wanted new students of optometry to be aware of, and appreciate, the history of the field. He created and delivered a lecture that addressed this concern and also provided his perspectives on the responsibilities of practitioners and the public image of optometry. This entire lecture, which remained very similar each year, was downloaded on youtube. He also contributed material to the CD From Eye Examination to Ophthalmic Lenses, a Chinese book on refraction, later editions of Clinical Refraction, System of Ophthalmic Dispensing, David Miller's Textbook of Ophthalmology, and several published articles. He received 3 of his 9 honorary degrees and 11 of his more than 60 awards after retirement. He continued to attend the AAO and AOA meetings and Essilor Symposiums.

Dr Borish passed away in Boca Raton, Florida on March 3, 2012. He was 99.

Awards and notices 
 1968 - AOA Apollo Award (American Optometric Association) Nominated by Dr. H.W. Hofstetter, Division of Optometry
 1968 - Indiana University - Honorary LL. D degree
 1975 - Pennsylvania College of Optometry - Honorary D.Sc. degree
 1979 - American Optometric Students Association - Golden Key International Award
 1982 - Paul Harris Fellow 
 1983 - Retired from Indiana University - Title of Professor Emeritus of Optometry
 1983 - Nominated to the National Academy of Practice in Optometry as a distinguished practitioner in Optometry
 1983 - Southern California College of Optometry in Fullerton - Honorary degree of Doctor of Ocular Science
 1984 - State University of New York at Albany - Honorary degree of Doctor of Science in Optometry
 1985 - American Academy of Optometry's William Feinbloom Award. 
 1989 - American Optometric Association - Distinguished Service Award
 1987 - Tel Aviv University - Friendship Award
 1987 - Heart of America Contact Lens/Primary Care Congress - Visual Services Award
 1988 - American Academy of Optometry - Max Schapero Memorial Lecturer award, for his significant contribution to contact lens research
 1988 - AOA (American Optometric Association) - Life Membership 
 1988 - AOA Contact Lens Person of the Year
 1989 - AOA Distinguished Services Award - An announcement in the AOA Bulletin said - "Congratulations to Dr Irvin M. Borish… Irv has been selected for the AOA Distinguished Services Award for 1989 to be awarded at the Congress in New York… Irv was an AOA Apollo awardee in 1968 and has more honorary degrees than a trigonometry class."
 1998 - Only living person to be inducted into the National Optometry Hall of Fame.

Contributions 
 He was co-founder and Vice President of the Indiana Contact Lens, Inc.. 
 He has served as consultant of major optical companies including Bausch and Lomb, Ciba-Geigy, and American Hydron.
 He was chairman of the International Advisory Board for the Tel Aviv University Optometry Program
 He has held visiting professorships in 11 schools.
 He helped found 
 The Association of Schools and Colleges of Optometry
 The AOA Council on Clinical Optometric Care
 The Association of Contact Lens Manufacturers
Optometric Research Institute
 He co-wrote the first accreditation manual for the AOA Council on Education
 He helped set up first optometry school in China
 He invented the Borish Vectographic Nearpoint Card, which was a device for testing both eyes simultaneously while reading.

Patents 

 US 3,238,676 - Method for altering the power of a Corneal Contact Lens
 US 3,360,889 - Method for altering the power of a Corneal Contact Lens
 US 3,430,391 - Apparatus for altering the power of a corneal contact lens
 CA 878212 - Apparatus and method for altering the power of a corneal contact lens and product resulting therefrom
 CA 853920 - Corneal contact lens polishing

Publications 
 Borish I.M. Outline of Optometry. Chicago: LeGros & Co., 1938.
 Borish I.M. Clinical Refraction. Chicago: Professional Press, 1949; 2nd Edition, 1954; 3rd edition, 1970; 3rd edition in 2 volumes, 1975.
 Borish I.M. Comments on a "delayed subjective" test. Am J Optom Arch Am Acad Optom 1945;22:433 - 436.
 Borish I.M. Comments on the large undergraduate enrollment in certain optometric colleges. Am J Optom Arch Am Acad Optom 1946;23:530 - 538.
 Borish I.M. Prismatic prescriptions – a clinical report on 147 cases. Am J Optom Arch Am Acad Optom 1948;25:579 - 592.
 Borish I.M. Comments about subjective refraction and the importance of reliable communication. J Am Optom Assoc 1960;31:457 - 462.
 Borish I.M. Historical development of refractive techniques. J Am Optom Assoc 1967;38:941 - 945.
 Borish I.M. Indiana University – Division of Optometry. J Am Optom Assoc 1968;39:270 - 276.
 Borish I.M. Ballasted cylinder lenses. J Am Optom Assoc 1971; 42:243.
 Borish I.M. Optometric education. J Am Optom Assoc 1975; 46:540 - 543.
 Borish I.M. Ballasted cylindrical lenses. J Am Optom Assoc 1976;47:318.
 Borish I.M. The Borish near point chart. J Am Optom Assoc 1978;49:41 - 44.
 Brooks C.W., Borish I.M. System for Ophthalmic Dispensing. Chicago: Professional Press, 1979; 2nd edition, Boston: Butterworth Heinemann, 1966.
 Borish I.M., Hitzeman SA, Brookman KE. Double masked study of progressive addition lenses. J Am Optom Assoc 1980; 51:933 - 943.
 Borish I.M., Soni S. Bifocal contact lenses. J Am Optom Assoc 1982; 53:219 - 229.
 Borish I.M. The Academy and professionalism. Am J Optom Physiol Opt 1983; 60:18 - 23.
 Borish I.M., Hitzeman S.A. Comparison of the acceptance of progressive addition multifocals with blended bifocals. J Am Optom Assoc 1983; 54:415 - 422.
 Borish I.M. Aphakia: perceptual and refractive problems of spectacle correction. J Am Optom Assoc 1983; 54:701 - 711.
 Borish IM, Perrigin D. Relative movement of lower lid and line of sight from distant to near fixation. Am J Optom Physiol Opt 1987; 64:881 - 887.
 Borish IM. Pupil dependency of bifocal contact lenses. Am J Optom Physiol Opt 1988; 65:417 - 423.
 Benjamin WJ, Borish IM. Physiology of aging and its influence on the contact lens prescription. J Am Optom Assoc 1991; 62:743 - 753.
 Borish IM. Don't leave a vacuum. Optom Economics 1991; 62:718 - 721.
 Borish IM. Teaching the traditional optometry with the new optometry. Optom Vis Sci 1993; 70:637 - 639.
 Young J.M., Borish I.M. Adaptability of a broad spectrum of randomly selected patients to a variable design progressive lens: report of a nationwide clinical trial. J Am Optom Assoc 1994; 65:445 - 450.
 Borish I.M., Catania LJ. Traditional versus computer - assisted refraction: "Which is better?" J Am Optom Assoc 1997; 68:749 - 756. (erratum in J Am Optom Assoc 1998; * 69:484)
 Borish IM. Optometry: Its heritage and its future. Indiana J Optom 2001; 4:23 - 31.

References 

1913 births
2012 deaths
People from Philadelphia
American optometrists
Indiana University faculty
American textbook writers